Diplomatic Enclave is a secure zone in Islamabad, Pakistan which contains diplomatic missions. The enclave is located in Sector G-5 and houses 43 embassies and high commissions. The secure zone is not accessible to the general public without a pass.

See also

 List of diplomatic missions in Pakistan

References

 
Diplomatic missions in Islamabad
Diplomatic districts